Illinois Central Passenger Depot-Storm Lake, also known as the Storm Lake Depot, was an historic building located in Storm Lake, Iowa, United States. The Iowa Falls & Sioux City Railroad, an Illinois Central Railroad (IC) subsidiary, built the first tracks through town in 1870. They also built a two-story frame combination freight and passenger depot the same year. The present depot is a second generation IC structure built of brick. The building's architectural style is Prairie School with Tudor Revival elements in the dormer and canopy ends. It was designed by IC architect E.E. Bihl, and it is similar to the railroad's depots in Flossmoor, Illinois and Fort Dodge, Iowa. The new passenger depot was completed in August, 1915, and the old depot was re-purposed for a dedicated freight depot. It was torn down sometime before 1948. Passenger service remained high during the 1910s and 1920s, with the decline accelerating after World War II, and it ended all together in the late 1960s. While freight trains continue to use the IC's tracks, the depot has been abandoned. It was listed on the National Register of Historic Places in 1990. The Storm Lake Illinois Central depot was demolished on February 25, 2013.

References

Railway stations in the United States opened in 1915
Prairie School architecture in Iowa
Transportation buildings and structures in Buena Vista County, Iowa
National Register of Historic Places in Buena Vista County, Iowa
Railway stations on the National Register of Historic Places in Iowa
Former railway stations in Iowa
Former Illinois Central Railroad stations
Storm Lake, Iowa